The United Congregational Church (also called First Congregational Church, Second Congregational Church and Newport Congregational Church) is a historic former church building in Newport, Rhode Island. The congregation was formerly affiliated with the United Church of Christ (UCC). Built in 1857, the church was designated a National Historic Landmark in 2012, in recognition for the unique interior decorations executed in 1880–81 by John La Farge.

History

The congregation was gathered as Newport's First Congregational Church in 1695 by Rev. Nathaniel Clap, a Harvard College graduate who ministered to the Newport congregation until his death in 1745.  The Second Congregational Church of Newport started another congregation in 1735, but the two later reunited.  The congregation was active during the American Revolution and both churches' meeting houses were used as barracks and hospitals by the British and French troops in Newport.  Dr. Samuel Hopkins was the minister of the church in the late eighteenth century.

As of 2009, the church was pastored by the Reverends Mary Beth Hayes and Nan L. Baker. The church has since closed, and the has undergone renovation to become an events center.

Building
The current building is a Romanesque Revival structure, designed by Joseph C. Wells of New York City and completed in 1857.  It is a basically rectangular building, built out of Connecticut brownstone, with two ornately decorated towers.  In the 1880s the congregation retained the artist John LaFarge to redecorate its interior.  LaFarge had recently completed work on Trinity Church, Boston, and sought to provide a more elaborate interior than he was able to in Boston.  He produced twenty stained glass windows and a series of murals, which represent the only fully integrated ecclesiastical interior he produced.  The church was listed on the National Register of Historic Places in 1971, and designated a National Historic Landmark in 2012.

See also

Clarke Street Meeting House
List of National Historic Landmarks in Rhode Island
National Register of Historic Places listings in Newport County, Rhode Island

References

Further reading

External links

Romanesque Revival architecture in Rhode Island
Romanesque Revival church buildings in the United States
United Church of Christ churches in Rhode Island
Churches on the National Register of Historic Places in Rhode Island
Churches completed in 1857
19th-century United Church of Christ church buildings
Churches in Newport, Rhode Island
1695 establishments in Rhode Island
Historic American Buildings Survey in Rhode Island
National Historic Landmarks in Rhode Island
National Register of Historic Places in Newport, Rhode Island
Historic district contributing properties in Rhode Island
Congregational churches in Rhode Island